Encyonema is a genus of diatoms belonging to the family Cymbellaceae.

The genus has cosmopolitan distribution.

Species

Species:

Encyonema abruptirostratum 
Encyonema accedens 
Encyonema acquapurae

References

Cymbellales
Diatom genera